Padharo Mhare Desh is a 2011 film documenting a 10-day, 2000 kilometre road trip from Udaipur to Jodhpur, Jaisalmer to Bikaner and Jaipur in India.

Production
Made on digital format, using a ‘Sony HD Handycam,’ the film is narrated in English. The film is the outcome of a ten-day road trip through Rajasthan.

References

Indian road movies
2010s road movies
2010s English-language films